The 1960–61 season was Real Madrid Club de Fútbol's 58th season in existence and the club's 29th consecutive season in the top flight of Spanish football.

Summary
After winning the European Cup semi-finals and final last season, acting head coach "Miracle" Miguel Muñoz was promoted as full-time manager for this campaign. The team was defeated in the first round of the 1960–61 European Cup by FC Barcelona 3–4 on aggregate, now with László Kubala in the line-up, with the Catalans avenging a semi-finals defeat in the previous campaign months earlier.

With an early elimination in the European Cup, Madrid were aiming to clinch the domestic double, which was reachable. The club won its seventh league title (twelve points above runners-up Atlético Madrid and five matches before the season finale), and were then defeated in the Copa del Generalísino final for the second season in a row, again by Atlético Madrid. Puskas won the Pichichi individual award as the top goalscorer, with 28 league goals. At the start the campaign, Real Madrid clinched the first edition of the Intercontinental Cup, defeating Peñarol.

Squad

Transfers

Competitions

La Liga

League table

Position by round

Matches

European Cup

First round

Copa del Generalísimo

Round of 32

Round of 16

Quarter-finals

Semi-finals

Final

Intercontinental Cup

Statistics

Squad statistics

Players statistics

References
 Real Madrid – 1960–61 BDFutbol

Real Madrid
Real Madrid CF seasons
Spanish football championship-winning seasons